Dobroszów  (german-nazi 1937-1945 Rummelsdorf) is a village in the administrative district of Gmina Przeworno, within Strzelin County, Lower Silesian Voivodeship, in south-western Poland. Prior to 1945 it was in Germany.

References

Villages in Strzelin County